Gaelic is an adjective that means "pertaining to the Gaels".  As a noun it refers to the group of languages spoken by the Gaels, or to any one of the languages individually.  Gaelic languages are spoken in Ireland, Scotland, the Isle of Man, and Canada.

Languages
 Goidelic languages or Gaelic languages, a linguistic group that is one of the two branches of the Insular Celtic languages; they include:
 Primitive Irish or Archaic Irish, the oldest known form of the Goidelic (Gaëlic) languages.
 Old Irish or Old Gaelic, used c. AD 600–900
 Middle Irish or Middle Gaelic, used c. AD 900–1200
 Irish language, including Classical Modern Irish and Early Modern Irish, c. 1200-1600)
 Gaelic type, a typeface used in Ireland
 Scottish Gaelic, historically sometimes called  in Scots and English
 Canadian Gaelic ( or ), a dialect of Scottish Gaelic spoken in the Canadian Maritime region. 
 Manx language ( or ), Gaelic language with Norse elements

Culture and history
Gaelic Ireland, the history of the Gaelic people of Ireland
Gaelic literature
Gaelic revival, a movement in the late 19th century to encourage both the use of Irish Gaelic in Ireland and the revival of older Irish cultural practices
Gaelic-Norse, a people of combined Gaelic-Scandinavian culture influential in the Middle Ages
Traditional Gaelic music, the music of the Gaelic people

Sports
 Gaelic Athletic Association the governing body of Gaelic games such as hurling and Gaelic football ( Éire / Ireland)
 Gaelic games, traditional sports played in Ireland, notably Gaelic football, Gaelic handball, Hurling/Camogie, and Rounders.
Gaelic football, an Irish version of football
Gaelic handball, an Irish version of handball

Other uses
 A Gaelic Blessing, a 1978 choral composition by John Rutter
Gaelic Symphony, an 1896 symphony composed by Amy Beach
SS Gaelic, two ships of the White Star Line
, a ferry in service 1949-60

See also 
 Galic (surname)
 :Category:Goidelic languages
 Gallic (disambiguation)